Gustavo Nápoles (born May 11, 1973), is a Mexican former football player and manager who played as an attacking midfielder and striker, and was most recently an assistant manager at Coras de Tepic.

Nicknamed "El Gusano" ("The Worm") for the way he celebrated his goals, he began his career with Tigres, debuting against Santos Laguna on November 16, 1991. He played with his hometown team until 1995 when his contract was bought by Mexico's most famous team, Guadalajara. He gained most of his popularity playing for "El Rebaño Sagrado", and was part of the Championship winning team for the Verano 1997 Tournament. "El Gusano"'s left Guadalajara after the Verano 1998 Tournament, and he was traded to Atlante F.C., where he stayed for a year before being traded to América for the Verano 1999 season. His next move was to the relegated team Celaya for the Invierno 1999 season, after which he returned to Atlante F.C. for the Verano 2000 season. The 2000–2001 season saw his return to Guadalajara two more years, before moving to Jaguares. He soon moved to the relegated team Club Puebla in the 2003–2004 season, and later Ecuadorian club Espoli in 2005, before retiring at Tigres B in 2007.

References

Footballers from Nuevo León
Club Puebla players
Living people
1973 births
Association football midfielders
Mexico international footballers
Tigres UANL footballers
C.D. Guadalajara footballers
Club América footballers
Atlante F.C. footballers
Chiapas F.C. footballers
Sportspeople from Monterrey
Footballers at the 1995 Pan American Games
Pan American Games silver medalists for Mexico
Pan American Games medalists in football
Medalists at the 1995 Pan American Games
Mexican footballers